Kamkhut is a village in the Amasia Municipality in the Shirak Province of Armenia.

History 
Armenians and Azeris once lived in the village, as well as Greeks, who even had a church, of which a half-ruined wall remains in the center of the village. In 1988-1989 Armenians from Akhalkalaki, Gyumri, Talin, Amasia and Nagorno-Karabakh settled in the village.

Demographics
The population of the village since 1886 is as follows:

References 

Populated places in Shirak Province